Stade Charles de Gaulle is a multi-use stadium in Porto-Novo, Benin named after Charles de Gaulle.  It is currently used mostly for football matches and is used as the home stadium of AS Dragons FC de l'Ouémé, Aiglons FC.  The stadium has a capacity of 15,000 people.

References

Football venues in Benin
Buildings and structures in Porto-Novo